The SNCF Class BB 47000 "Prima" electric locomotive is a  locomotive, built by Alstom. This locomotive is the quadruple-voltage version of the Class BB 27000. So far, only one locomotive, numbered 47001, has been built and was tested by Fret SNCF with a view for further orders. In 2006 it became clear that SNCF wouldn't order this version anymore and the locomotive had passed on to Alstom as a permanent test bed locomotive for testing different Alstom technologies. In 2009, the locomotive was devoid of all technical components. Its bogies were re-used by the Prima II-prototype. The locomotive is now stored outside Alstom's Belfort plant.

References

47000
Alstom Prima electric locomotives
Bo′Bo′ locomotives
Standard gauge electric locomotives of France
Railway locomotives introduced in 2003
Multi-system locomotives

Freight locomotives
Individual locomotives of France